Asho or Asho Chin may refer to:

Asho Chin people
Asho Chin language

Language and nationality disambiguation pages